Daniel Johnston is a Republican member of the North Dakota House of Representatives and was first elected into office in 2016. He represents District 24. He lives in Kathryn. He has had 8 children with his wife Wendi.

Johnston is seeking the 2020 Republican nomination for North Dakota State Treasurer. He was poised to face fellow state representative Thomas Beadle at the 2020 Republican state convention, but the convention was canceled due to the ongoing COVID-19 pandemic. His candidacy has been endorsed by ND Right to Life, ND Family Policy Alliance, North Dakotan's State Treasurer of 16 years, Kelly Schmidt, as well as high-profile endorsements from Senator Kevin Cramer and U.S. President Donald Trump.

References 

Living people
Republican Party members of the North Dakota House of Representatives
Liberty University alumni
People from Barnes County, North Dakota
Year of birth missing (living people)
21st-century American politicians